Gabriel Rosati (born August 4, 1966 in Modena, Italy) is an Italian-born musician.

Rosati is a trumpeter, trombonist, composer, arranger, singer and versatile author of music books specializing in Afro-Cuban/Brazilian, jazz and film music styles.
He has authored publications for Mel Bay, ADG Productions, Charles Colin, Dorn, Carisch, Curci Editions, and Music Minus One.
 
Since 2010 he has been the lead trumpet and jazz soloist for several recording artists in the Los Angeles area. He also toured Brazil with the Manoel Cruz Trio, produced film music scores, performed jazz festivals across Europe. Between 2002 and 2009, he played in numerous events in California, Latin America and Miami.
 
Previously, after finishing academic studies, he performed nationally with Fred Bongusto, Sergio Cammariere, Renzo Arbore, Pino Daniele, Vinicio Capossela. Later from 1991 in the United States with greats such as: Billy Preston, Santana, Malo, Os Originais do Samba, John Lee Hooker, Oreste Vilatos, John Handy, Bob Mintzer, the Checkmates, Rique Pantoja, Sonora Dinamita, Sonora Santanera, Mariachi Universal in Miami, Angel Lebron, and Ismael Miranda.

In 1997, he was the opening act for three months at the Osaka Ritz Carlton Hotel with his own Jazz group. He also organized a "Perez Prado All Star" concerts series in Italy with some of the original members.

Gabriel was featured with his own original CD Play-Along "Brazilatafro Project" in "Jazz Player" magazine in 1999, 
Rosati has directed and recorded 19 CDs of his own since 1991.

He has been a teacher of workshops and master classes since 2000 at the Las Vegas Performing Arts, Miami Wallflower Gallery, Calstate University of Los Angeles, Fullerton College, Polytechnic in Long Beach.

Discography 

“San Francisco Sessions” – 1991  
“Pacific Time” – 1992   
“Brazilatafro Project” vol.1 - 1997 
“Brazilatafro Project” vol. 2 - 1999 
“El Nuevo Clasico” – 2000  
“Salsa!” – 2001     
“Brazilatafro Project Live in Italy” - 2001
“Brazilatafro Project” vol.3 – 2002
A New Life Start" - 2003  
“Brazilatafro Project Celebration” - 2005  
“Satiro” - 2006

Publications
"The Salsa Trumpet" by Mel Bay Publ. Inc.
"Latin American Trumpet Music" by Mel Bay Publ. Inc.
"The Latin Brass Soloist" by ADG Productions 
"Il Tombettista Autodidatta" by Carisch 
"Claudio Roditi Solos Transcriptions" by Colin Publ. New York 
"Brazilatafro Play-Along" Jazz Player magazine CD + charts by Dorn Publ.
"Milva Sings Piazzolla" by Edizioni Curci 
"Per Chi Suona La Tromba" by Edizioni Curci.

References

Living people
1966 births